Acupalpus foveicollis is an insect-eating ground beetle of the genus Acupalpus.

foveicollis
Beetles described in 1849